The Strangers' Bar is one of several bars in the Palace of Westminster, the home of the Parliament of the United Kingdom. It is open to Members of Parliament and officers of Parliament, their guests, and members of parliamentary staff.

See also 
 Strangers' Gallery

References 

Drinking establishments in London
Palace of Westminster